Carl Ludvig Berner (27 February 1913 – 30 October 2003) was a Danish rower. He competed at the 1936 Summer Olympics in Berlin with the men's coxed pair where they came fourth. At the same Olympics, he also competed with the men's eight; that team was eliminated in round one.

References

1913 births
2003 deaths
Danish male rowers
Olympic rowers of Denmark
Rowers at the 1936 Summer Olympics
Rowers from Copenhagen
European Rowing Championships medalists